is a former Japanese football player. His younger brother Takuya Mikami is also a football player.

Playing career
Mikami was born in Saitama on 29 August 1975. After graduating from Komazawa University, he joined J1 League club Vissel Kobe in 1998. He played many matches as left side back from first season. In 2000, he moved to Verdy Kawasaki on loan. He battles with Koichi Sugiyama for the position and played many matches. In 2001, he returned to Vissel Kobe. However he could not play at all in the match. In July 2001, he moved to JEF United Ichihara. He played many matches as substitute. In 2002, he moved to Yokohama F. Marinos. Although he played in 2 seasons, he could not play many matches. In 2004, he moved to Oita Trinita. Although he played as regular player, his opportunity to play decreased in late 2004. In 2005, he moved to newly was promoted to J1 League club, Omiya Ardija based in his local. Although he played as regular player, his opportunity to play decreased from late 2005 and he retired end of 2006 season.

Club statistics

References

External links

1975 births
Living people
Komazawa University alumni
Association football people from Saitama Prefecture
Japanese footballers
J1 League players
Vissel Kobe players
Tokyo Verdy players
JEF United Chiba players
Yokohama F. Marinos players
Oita Trinita players
Omiya Ardija players
Association football defenders